The Old Slave Mart is a building located at 6 Chalmers Street in Charleston, South Carolina that once housed an antebellum period slave auction gallery. Constructed in 1859, the building is believed to be the last extant slave auction facility in South Carolina. In 1975, the Old Slave Mart was added to the National Register of Historic Places for its role in Charleston's African American history. Today, the building houses the Old Slave Mart Museum.

The Old Slave Mart was originally part of a slave market known as Ryan's Slave Mart, which covered a large enclosed lot between Chalmers and Queen Streets. The market was established in 1856 by Charleston City Councilman Thomas Ryan, after a citywide ban on public slave auctions made private facilities necessary. Slave auctions were held at the site until approximately 1863; in 1865, the Union Army occupied Charleston and closed Ryan's Mart. The Old Slave Mart Museum has operated on and off since 1938.

Design

The front (south side) faces the cobblestone-paved Chalmers Street. The unique façade of the Old Slave Mart consists of  octagonal pillars at each end, with a central elliptical arch comprising the entrance.

The building originally contained one large room with a  ceiling. In 1878, a second floor was added, and the roof was overhauled. The arched entryway originally held an iron gate; in the late 1870s it was filled in with simple doors. Interior partitions were added in subsequent decades, dividing the first floor into three rooms.  Today, there is an iron gate in the archway once again.

History 
Throughout the first half of the 19th century, slaves brought into Charleston were sold at public auctions held on the north side of the Exchange and Provost building. After the city prohibited public slave auctions in 1856, enclosed slave markets sprang up along Chalmers, State, and Queen streets. One such market was Ryan's Mart, established by City Councilman and broker Thomas Ryan and his business partner James Marsh. Ryan's Mart originally consisted of a closed lot with three structures — a four-story barracoon or slave jail, a kitchen, and a morgue or "dead house."

In 1859, an auction master named Z. B. Oakes purchased Ryan's Mart, and built what is now the Old Slave Mart building for use as an auction gallery. In addition to slaves, the market sold real estate and stock. Slave auctions at Ryan's Mart were advertised in broadsheets throughout the 1850s, some appearing as far away as Galveston, Texas.

When Union forces occupied Charleston beginning in February 1865, the slaves still imprisoned at Ryan's Mart were freed.

In 1878, the Old Slave Mart was converted into a tenement dwelling, with a second floor added. A car dealership and showroom operated in the building in the 1920s, necessitating the expansion of the rear of the building.

Transition into a museum 

In 1938, Miriam B. Wilson purchased the building and established the Old Slave Mart Museum, which initially displayed African and African-American art. Wilson operated the museum on a shoestring budget until her death in 1959. Although Wilson was from Ohio, the Old Slave Mart Museum under her ownership embraced local beliefs that slavery had been good for African Americans. Wilson bequeathed the museum and its artifacts (mostly crafts made by African Americans in slavery) to the Charleston Museum which declined to take them. Wilson also sold Colonial Belle Goodies and attempted to attract a wider audience to the museum.

The museum closed in 1987 due to budgeting issues. The City of Charleston and the South Carolina African American Heritage Commission restored the Old Slave Mart in the late 1990s. The museum now interprets the history of the city's slave trade. The area behind the building, which once contained the barracoon and kitchen, is now a parking lot.

In the winter of 2018, the College of Charleston acquired several boxes of papers from the museum's early years. The collection went up for auction and was purchased by the College of Charleston for $5,400. In total, the collection was made up of 47 boxes, more than 50 linear feet of material.

See also
 Antebellum South Carolina

References

External links
 Old Slave Mart Museum - official website
 Historic Charleston's Religious and Community Buildings, a National Park Service Discover Our Shared Heritage Travel Itinerary
 Museum Grand Opening Press Release, October 2007

African-American history in Charleston, South Carolina
National Register of Historic Places in Charleston, South Carolina
Museums in Charleston, South Carolina
History museums in South Carolina
African-American museums in South Carolina
History of slavery in South Carolina
History of auctions
19th-century in Charleston, South Carolina
Slave pens